"Express" is a song by British singer and songwriter Dina Carroll, released in May 1993 as the fifth single from her first album, So Close (1993). The song was a chart success in the United Kingdom, peaking at number 12 on the UK Singles Chart. On the Eurochart Hot 100, it reached number 44 in June 1993.

Critical reception
Jon O'Brien from AllMusic noted the "jazz-funk" of the song. Pan-European magazine Music & Media commented that Carroll "uses the Bowie trick of implementing a weird noise just beyond the irritation factor. Very Dina-mic dance stuff." Alan Jones from Music Week gave it three out of five, noting that she "vamps it up on this pop/funk confection, one of the lesser tracks from her outstanding debut album So Close." In an retrospective review, Pop Rescue felt that the singer's vocals are "whispery, sometimes sultry". Phil Shanklin of ReviewsRevues stated that it "is unlike anything else on the album. A funky track with a honking sax – Dina comes off like a one-woman En Vogue in this club stomper." James Hamilton from the RM Dance Update called it a "choppy jiggler". Adam Higginbotham from Select described it as "solid, tastefully-cut soul bleeding subtly into brisk garage beats" and added that it is "careful funky". Another editor, Rupert Howe complimented the song's "aspiration towards funkiness".

Track listing

Personnel
 Design – Jeremy Pearce
 Mixing – CJ Mackintosh (tracks 1, 2, 4)
 Photography – Simon Fowler
 Production, original mix – Nigel Lowis (tracks 1, 2, 4)

Charts

References

External links

Dina Carroll songs
1993 singles
1993 songs
A&M Records singles
Songs written by Nigel Lowis
Songs written by Dina Carroll